The Play-offs of the 2019 Fed Cup Americas Zone Group II were the final stages of the Group II Zonal Competition involving teams from the Americas. Using the positions determined in their pools, the six teams in Lima faced off to determine their placing in the 2019 Fed Cup Americas Zone Group II. The winning team advanced to Group I in 2020, alongside the winning team from Pool A in Santo Domingo.

Pool results

Promotional play-offs 
The first placed teams of the two pools in Lima were drawn in head-to-head rounds. The winners advanced to Group I, alongside the winning team from Pool A in Santo Domingo.

Peru vs. Bahamas

Third to fourth place play-offs 
The second placed teams of the two pools in Lima were drawn in head-to-head rounds to determine the 3rd to 4th placings.

Bolivia vs. Trinidad and Tobago

Fifth to sixth place play-offs 
The third placed teams of the two pools in Lima were drawn in head-to-head rounds to determine the 5th to 6th placings.

Barbados vs. Panama

Final placements 

See also 
 Fed Cup structure

References

External links 
 Fed Cup website

P2